These are the results of the men's singles competition in badminton at the 2011 Southeast Asian Games in Jakarta.

Medal winners

Draw

Top half

Bottom half

Finals

References 
Results

Badminton at the 2011 Southeast Asian Games